Zlatá Baňa is a village and municipality in Prešov District in the Prešov Region of eastern Slovakia.

Name
The name of the village means literally the "Gold Mine".

History
In historical records the village was first mentioned in 1550.

Geography
The municipality lies at an altitude of 590 metres and covers an area of 31.732 km2. It has a population of about 412.

References

External links
http://www.zlatabana.sk

Villages and municipalities in Prešov District
Šariš